Bishop Luers High School is a small Catholic high school located in the southside of Fort Wayne, Indiana, United States. Bishop Luers is owned and operated by the Roman Catholic Diocese of Fort Wayne-South Bend. The school was founded in 1958 by the Franciscan Fathers of the Saint John the Baptist Province in Cincinnati, Ohio, along with the Sisters of Saint Francis Province in Mishawaka, Indiana. The first bishop of the diocese, John Henry Luers, is the namesake of the school.

Academics
Bishop Luers' education departments consist of art, business, religion, English, foreign language, mathematics, and social studies. In 2004 and in 2005, Bishop Luers was placed on the Catholic High School Honor Roll Top 50 Secondary Schools in America.

Extra-curricular activities
Bishop Luers offers an array of activities for students. Activities include Academic Super Bowl, National Honor Society (NHS), Key Club, Student Council, Drama Club, The Bishop Luers Minstrels Show Choir, Pep Band, Speech and Debate, Newspaper, Yearbook, World Culture Club, Students Against Destructive Decisions (SADD), Future Business Leaders of America, Freshmen Mentoring, and Student Ambassadors.

Athletics
The Bishop Luers Knights field teams in 19 sanctioned sports and 6 non-sanctioned (club) sports.  All sanctioned sports are governed by the Indiana High School Athletic Association (IHSAA).  The lacrosse team is a member of the Indiana High School Lacrosse Association.

All sanctioned Bishop Luers teams compete in the Summit Athletic Conference (SAC).

In 2008, Bishop Luers became the first team in Indiana high school athletic history to win and hold the three major male sports titles (football, basketball, and baseball) in one year since 1973, the first year all three were recognized by the Indiana High School Athletic Association.

Programs offered

Luers' main rival is Bishop Dwenger High School, a Catholic school on the north side of Fort Wayne.  Luers also has a spirited neighborhood rivalry with South Side High School, which is often termed "The Battle for Calhoun Street."

State championships
The Knights' athletic program has produced 20 team state champions in their history.

Football
Bishop Luers has been to the Indiana state finals for football fifteen times, including four consecutive years, 1999 through 2002. Eleven of those fifteen trips have resulted in football championships, all in Class 2A, including four consecutive wins in 2009, 2010, 2011 and 2012. The fifteen championship appearances are the most of any team in Indiana football history, and the eleven championships tie the state record.

The Knights' roster has included many accomplished players who have gone on to play successfully at the professional and NCAA Division I levels. Among the most notable are Jack Johnston star quarterback, who led the Knights to their best regular season record to date. Anthony Spencer of the NFL's Dallas Cowboys and Jaylon Smith, winner of the 2012 high school Butkus Award and the 2012 Indiana Mr. Football award, are also alumni.

Boys' basketball
Coinciding with the 2004 hiring of head coach James Blackmon, Sr., recent seasons have seen championship success for the boys' basketball team. For the four seasons 2006/07 – 2009/10, the Knights' roster featured Deshaun Thomas, recipient of the 2010 Indiana Mr. Basketball award. The Knights won two consecutive boys' basketball Class 2A state championships, in 2008 and 2009.

On May 21, 2010, in a ceremony at Bishop Luers, Thomas' jersey (#1) was retired by the school.  This was the first time in school history a jersey of any of its athletes had been retired.

Girls' basketball
The girls' basketball team won three consecutive Indiana State Class 2A Championship games, in the 1998/99, 1999/2000, and 2000/01 seasons.  The following season the team moved up a class, winning a fourth consecutive state title, in Class 3A, in 2001/02. The Knights also won the 2005/06 Class 3A championship.

The Knights' six state championships currently stand as the most all-time by one school in Indiana girls' basketball history, as do the nine championship game appearances.

Baseball
In 2008, the boys' baseball team competed for the first time in the state baseball championship, winning the 2A title.

Notable alumni
Angie Akers (Harris), beach volleyball player, (Association of Volleyball Professionals), Notre Dame
Thomas Hammock, head coach of Northern Illinois University football team
Kevin Kiermaier, professional baseball player, Tampa Bay Rays of MLB
Zach Klein, co-founder of video social networking site Vimeo
Austin Mack, NFL player
Jaylon Smith, football player, middle linebacker for New York Giants
Anthony Spencer, football player, outside linebacker for Dallas Cowboys
Deshaun Thomas, basketball player
Paul Mendez, fashion enthusiast

See also
 List of high schools in Indiana
 Summit Athletic Conference (IHSAA)

References

External links

Bishop Luers Baseball
Diocese of Fort Wayne-South Bend

 
 

Schools in Fort Wayne, Indiana
Roman Catholic Diocese of Fort Wayne–South Bend
Catholic secondary schools in Indiana
Private high schools in Indiana
Educational institutions established in 1958
1958 establishments in Indiana